Ramzi Baalbaki (born October 27, 1951) is a professor of the Arabic language at the American University of Beirut in Lebanon. During a career which has spanned over thirty years, Baalbaki has been recognized as a significant contributor to the field of Arabic grammar studies.

Education
Baalbaki earned his Bachelor of Arts with distinction in 1973 and his Master of Arts in 1975 from the American University of Beirut and his Doctor of Philosophy  in 1978 from the School of Oriental and African Studies in London.

Career
Baalbaki has been hosted as a visiting scholar at the University of Cambridge and University of Chicago as well as both a visiting scholar and scholar-in-residence at Georgetown University. His work has had a significant impact on Arabic linguistic studies in the Western world, and in 2010 he received the King Faisal International Prize for his extensive contributions to the field.

In 2013, the Arab Center for Research and Policy Studies launched the Doha Historical Dictionary of the Arabic Language with Baalbaki as the head of the project's academic council.

Citations

Lebanese writers
Literary critics of Arabic
Living people
1951 births
Academic staff of the American University of Beirut
Alumni of SOAS University of London